Black Monday refers to specific Mondays when undesirable or turbulent events have occurred.

Black Monday may also refer to:

Events
Black Monday (1360), a freak hail storm killing 1,000 English soldiers
Black Monday (1894), the Newfoundland bank crash
Black Monday (1929), the Wall Street crash
Black Monday (Malta), 15 October 1979, when the Progress Press was ransacked following a Labour Party rally
Black Monday (1987), a global stock market crash 
Black Monday (September 2008), in the 2007–2008 financial crisis
Black Monday (2011), a US and global stock market crash
Black Monday (China), a 2015–2016 Chinese stock market turbulence
Black Monday (2020), a stock market crash

Other uses
Black Monday (TV series), a 2019 American historical dark comedy
Black Monday (album), a 2000 album by Dice
Black Monday (card game), a 1988 game by Sid Sackson
Black Monday (film), a 1922 German silent film
Black Monday, professional name of American record producer and composer Jeff Kleinman

See also
Black Thursday
Black Friday (disambiguation)